Emogene Augusta Creque (born 22 July 1919) is a British Virgin Islands former politician. In 1965 she became the first female member of the Legislative Council.

Biography
Creque was born in July 1919 in Road Town, the daughter of Anita Nibbs and Frederick Pickering. In 1942 she married Henry Creque, with whom she had seven children. Her husband later became a member of the Legislative Council. In 1965 Emogene was also appointed to the Council as a temporary substitute for Joseph O'Neal while he was abroad, becoming its first female member. Creque turned 100 in July 2019.

References

1919 births
Living people
People from Road Town
British Virgin Islands women in politics
Members of the House of Assembly of the British Virgin Islands
Women centenarians